Kristin Inga Thompson (born January 27, 1964) is a retired road bicycle racer. She competed at the 1984, 1988 and 1992 Olympics with the best result of eighth place in 1988. She won silver medals at the world championships in 1987, 1990 and 1991, and placed third at the Tour de France in 1986 and 1989. Nationally she won United States National Road Race Championships in 1987, 1988, 1990, 1991 and 1993.

Inga Thompson was inducted into the US Bicycling Hall of Fame in 2014  She continues to be on many advocacy boards for Women in Sports.

Activism
In 2019 Thompson obtained the signatures of over 80 Olympians to advocate for categories separated by sex assigned at birth submitted to the IOC in hopes Women's Voices would be heard.  She maintains that women's voices have been silenced. Thompson continues her work with Nancy Hogshead-Makar, Alison Sydor, Martina Navratilova, Sharon Davies, and many prominent women athletes to advocate for categories separated by sex at birth.

Also in 2019 Thompson was interviewed for an article opposing participation of transgender women in cycling events, and instead advocating for a separate transgender category. This prompted an outcry from members of the Oregon Bicycle Racing Association who called for her removal from the organization's board of directors as her statements did not align with the policies of the organization. While the board initially voted to retain her as a board member, she resigned 3 days later to pursue advocacy for protecting women's sports.

Major results 

1984
 21st – 1984 Los Angeles Olympics
1985
 13th – World Championships (Road Race)
1986
 3rd – Grande Boucle (Tour de France Feminine)2 Stage Wins Individual Time Trial
1987
 1st – National Championships (Individual Time Trial)
 1st – National Championships (Team Time Trial)
 2nd – World Championships (Team Time Trial)
 2nd – Pan American Games (Road Race)
1988
 1st – National Championships (Road Race)
 1st – USCF Olympic Trials (Road Race)
 8th – 1988 Summer Olympics
 1st – Coors Classic Overall G.C.
1989
 1st – National Championships (Time Trials)
 3rd – Grande Boucle (Tour de France Feminine)
1990
 2nd – World Championships (Team Time Trial)
 1st – National Championships (Team Time Trials)
 1st – National Championships (Individual Time Trial)
 1st – Ore-Ida Women's Challenge, Overall G.C., Longest Women's Stage Race in the World (17 stages, 
1991
 1st – National Championships (Road Race)
 1st – National Championships (Time Trials)(National Record)
 2nd – World Championships (Road Race)
1992
 26th – 1992 Barcelona Olympics
 2nd – National Championships (Road Race)
 1st – Olympic Trials (Road Race)
 1st – US National Rankings.
1993
 1st – National Championships (Road Race)

References

External links
 Pro Women's Cycling

1964 births
Living people
Sportspeople from Reno, Nevada
People from Halfway, Oregon
American female cyclists
American cycling road race champions
Olympic cyclists of the United States
Cyclists at the 1984 Summer Olympics
Cyclists at the 1988 Summer Olympics
Cyclists at the 1992 Summer Olympics
Pan American Games medalists in cycling
Pan American Games silver medalists for the United States
Cyclists at the 1987 Pan American Games
Medalists at the 1987 Pan American Games
21st-century American women